Mictopsichia mincae is a species of moth of the family Tortricidae. It is found in Mexico and Colombia.

The wingspan is about 12 mm. The ground colour of the forewings is pale orange, consisting of basal and subapical streaks, a weak mark at the mid-costa and a line beyond the subterminal refractive marking. The termen is brownish and the dorso-median area is cream. The hindwings are pale orange with brownish apical markings.

Etymology
The name refers to the type locality, Minca, Colombia.

References

Moths described in 2009
Mictopsichia
Moths of South America
Moths of Central America
Taxa named by Józef Razowski